Hieracium silenii is a species of flowering plant belonging to the family Asteraceae.

It is native to Finland, the Baltic states, Belarus, and northern and northwestern Russia.

References

silenii
Flora of Finland
Flora of the Baltic states
Flora of Belarus
Flora of North European Russia
Flora of Northwest European Russia
Plants described in 1878